David Phillips is an American civil engineer best known for accumulating frequent flyer miles by taking advantage of a promotion by Healthy Choice Foods in 1999.

Phillips, who works as the Associate Vice President of Energy and Sustainability at University of California Office of the President, calculated while grocery shopping that the value of a mail-in promotion for frequent flyer miles exceeded the cost of the pudding on which it was offered. In May 1999, Phillips received 1,253,000 frequent flyer miles.

Process
Healthy Choice was running a promotion offering 500 miles for each pack of 10 Healthy Choice bar codes (UPC) mailed in as proof of purchase.  Valuing each mile at 2 cents, Phillips calculated that the return per UPC ($1) was worth a significant part of the price of a frozen meal (which were selling for $2), but while shopping he also found Healthy Choice soup cans for only $0.90.

He later discovered the same promotion also included individual pudding packages at 25 cents each, while shopping at a nearby Grocery Outlet.  He subsequently visited ten Grocery Outlet stores in the Sacramento area, buying every case of pudding available, totaling 12,150 individual servings of pudding, for $3,140.   He also had the Grocery Outlet manager order additional cases.  In order to divert attention, he claimed he was stocking up for Y2K. Clerks started calling him "Pudding Guy".

The promotion included an early-bird bonus if the packages were mailed during May 1999 (the mileage earned would double from 500 miles to 1,000 miles for every 10 UPCs submitted).  Phillips, unable to remove all the UPCs himself in such a short time, recruited members of a local Salvation Army branch to cut the UPC codes off the cardboard wrapped around the pudding containers; in exchange, Phillips donated the individual puddings. This donation allowed him to receive $815 in tax write-offs further increasing his return on investment.

Outcome
Phillips submitted proof of mailing the certificates and Healthy Choice Foods awarded him 1,253,000 frequent flyer miles.  He would apply some of the miles to his United, Delta, and Northwest frequent flyer accounts, and the majority (over 1 million miles) to his AAdvantage account, in the process earning him lifetime Gold status.

It is also speculated that neither ConAgra, the owners of the Healthy Choice brand, nor the airlines were seriously disadvantaged by the outcome, due to the small price paid by ConAgra to the airlines and the resultant publicity gained.

Since 2000, Phillips continues to take advantage of frequent flyer promotions, and is earning points five times faster than he is spending them, now having reached lifetime Platinum status on his AAdvantage account.

Phillips' pudding story received international attention from news outlets such as The Wall Street Journal and  The Times. The story was the inspiration for a sub-plot in the 2002 Paul Thomas Anderson feature film Punch-Drunk Love.

See also
 Hoover free flights promotion in Britain in the early 1990s, whereby flights to the United States were offered for purchasing lower-priced appliances.

References

External links
David Phillips on the Davis Wiki

1964 births
Living people
American civil engineers
Engineers from California
University of California, Davis faculty
Place of birth missing (living people)